David Douglass may refer to:

 David Douglass (actor) (1720–1786), British-American stage actor and theatre manager
 David Bates Douglass (1790–1849), civil and military engineer
 David Douglass (physicist) (born 1932), American physicist
 David F. Douglass, member of the California legislature
 David John Douglass, English political activist and writer

See also 
 David Douglas (disambiguation)